Surinam, also unofficially known as Dutch Guiana, was a Dutch plantation colony in the Guianas, bordered by the equally Dutch colony of Berbice to the west, and the French colony of Cayenne to the east. It later bordered British Guiana from 1831 to 1966.

History

The colonization of Suriname 

Surinam was a Dutch colony from 26 February 1667, when Dutch forces captured Francis Willoughby's English colony during the Second Anglo-Dutch War, until 15 December 1954, when Surinam became a constituent country of the Kingdom of the Netherlands. The status quo of Dutch sovereignty over Surinam, and English sovereignty over New Netherland, which it had conquered in 1664, was kept in the Treaty of Breda of 31 July 1667, and again confirmed in the Treaty of Westminster of 1674.

After the other Dutch colonies in the Guianas, i.e., Berbice, Essequibo, Demerara, and Pomeroon, were lost to the British in 1814, the remaining colony of Surinam was often referred to as Dutch Guiana, especially after 1831, when the British merged Berbice, Essequibo, and Demerara into British Guiana. As the term Dutch Guiana was used in the 17th and 18th centuries to refer to all Dutch colonies in the Guianas, this use of the term can be confusing (see below).

Dutch Guiana 

Although the colony has always been officially known as Surinam or Suriname, in both Dutch and English, the colony was often unofficially and semi-officially referred to as Dutch Guiana (Dutch: Nederlands Guiana) in the 19th and 20th century, in an analogy to British Guiana and French Guiana. Historically, Suriname was only one of many Dutch colonies in the Guianas, others being Berbice, Essequibo, Demerara, and Pomeroon, which after being taken over by the United Kingdom in 1814, were united into British Guiana in 1831. The Dutch also controlled northern Brazil from 1630 to 1654, including the area that, when governed by Lisbon, was called Portuguese Guiana. Thus, before 1814, the term Dutch Guiana did not only describe Suriname, but rather all colonies under Dutch sovereignty in the region taken together: a set of polities, with distinct governments, whose external borders changed much over time.

Slave labor in the colony 

The economy of the Colony of Suriname depended upon people enslaved at its plantations. Slave labour was mostly supplied by the Dutch West India Company from its trading posts in West Africa, to produce their crops. Sugar, cotton, and indigo were the main goods exported from the colony to the Netherlands until the early 18th century, when coffee became the single most important export product of Surinam. Planters' treatment of the slaves was notoriously bad. The historian C.R. Boxer wrote that "man's inhumanity to man just about reached its limits in Surinam", and many slaves escaped the plantations. The Amsterdam Stock Exchange crashed in 1773, which dealt a severe blow to the plantation economy that was further exacerbated by the British abolition of the slave trade in 1807. This abolition was adopted by William I of the Netherlands, who signed a royal decree in this regard in June 1814, and who concluded the Anglo-Dutch Slave Trade Treaty in May 1818. Many plantations went bankrupt as a consequence of the abolition of slave trade. Without supply of slaves, many plantations were merged to increase efficiency.

Abolition of slavery 
Slavery was eventually abolished on 1 July 1863, although slaves were only released after a ten-year transitory period in 1873. This spurred the immigration of indentured labourers from British India, after a treaty to that effect had been signed between the Netherlands and the United Kingdom in 1870. Apart from immigration from British India, Javanese workers from the Dutch East Indies were also contracted to work on plantations in Surinam. At the same time, a largely unsuccessful attempt to colonize Surinam with impoverished farmers from the Netherlands was started as well.

The natural resources of Suriname 
In the 20th century, the natural resources of Surinam, which include rubber, gold and bauxite, were exploited. 

The gold rush that followed the discovery of gold on the banks of the Lawa River spurred the construction of the Lawa Railway in 1902, although construction was halted after gold production proved disappointing. In the 1930s, the grandmother of Hennah Draaibaar discovered more than 80 kilos of gold, which made her briefly the richest woman in Surinam; the Dutch took most of the gold to the Netherlands.

In 1916, the U.S. aluminium company Alcoa began mining bauxite on the banks of the Cottica River, near the village of Moengo. In 1938, the company built an aluminium smelter in Paranam.

The 1930s were a difficult time for Suriname. The Great Depression created great unemployment. Surinamese guest workers in Curaçao and other islands of the Netherlands Antilles returned to Suriname because there was no more work, which exacerbated the problem. No more funds came in and more unemployed people were added. To provide work, roads were built to Domburg and Groningen, and the Meursweg was constructed. The Salvation Army set up a soup kitchen to relieve the worst of necessities. However, this was not enough, and there was a great deal of unrest among the population in 1931, leading to demonstrations and street riots with looting. Nationalist Anton de Kom then came to Suriname to set up a workers' organization there: he established a consultancy firm, but when he organized a demonstration against governor Johannes Kielstra, he was imprisoned. A rally to get him released led to Black Tuesday, in which 2 people were shot. De Kom was then put on a boat to the Netherlands. The Dutch Prime Minister Colijn stated in the Lower House in 1935:

 "Everything that has been tried in Suriname, it all simply failed. Things are not easy. And that is why I wanted someone to get up in the Netherlands who knew what could be done. I will do the possible."

However, the situation had improved somewhat on the eve of the Second World War.

Partly due to the importance of Surinamese aluminium for the allied war effort, United States troops were stationed in Surinam under an agreement with the Dutch government in exile on 23 November 1941. Under the provisions of the Atlantic Charter of August 1941, the Dutch government in exile promised to end the colonial relations between the Netherlands and its overseas possessions, promising them far-reaching autonomy and self-rule. This was eventually accomplished by the proclamation of the Charter for the Kingdom of the Netherlands on 15 December 1954, which constituted a Kingdom in which the Netherlands, the Netherlands Antilles, and Suriname participated on a basis of equality. In 1975, Suriname left the Kingdom of the Netherlands to become the independent country of Suriname.

Administration 

From 1683, the colony was governed by the Society of Suriname, a company composed of three equal shareholders, being the city of Amsterdam, the family Van Aerssen van Sommelsdijck, and the Dutch West India Company. Although the organization and administration was of the colony was limited to these three shareholders, all citizens of the Dutch Republic were free to trade with Suriname. Also, the planters were consulted in a Council of Police, which was a unique feature among the colonies of Guiana.

In November 1795, the Society was nationalized by the Batavian Republic. From then on until 1954, the Batavian Republic and its legal successors (the Kingdom of Holland and the Kingdom of the Netherlands) governed the territory as a national colony, barring a period of British occupation between 1799 and 1802, and between 1804 and 1816.

After the Batavian Republic took over in 1795, the Dutch government issued various government regulations for Suriname (Dutch: Regeringsreglement voor Suriname), establishing the government of the colony. In 1865, a new government regulation replaced the previous regulation of 1832, which theoretically gave Suriname some limited self-rule. The colonial elite was given the right to elect a Colonial Council (Dutch: Koloniale Raad) which would co-govern the colony together with the Governor-General appointed by the Dutch crown. Among others, the Colonial Council was allowed to decide over the colony's budget, which was subject to approval by the Dutch crown, but which did not see any involvement of Dutch parliament.

In the wake of the 1922 Dutch constitutional revision, in which the term "colony" was replaced by "overseas territory", the 1865 government regulation was replaced by the Basic Law of Suriname (Dutch: Staatsregeling van Suriname) on 1 April 1937. This Basic Law renamed the Colonial Council to Estates of Suriname (Dutch: Staten van Suriname) and increased the membership from 13 to 15.

After the Second World War, during which the Dutch government in exile had pledged to review the relationship between the Netherlands and its colonies, the Basic Law was heavily revised. In March 1948, revisions to the Basic Law were adopted by Dutch parliament, which introduced universal suffrage for both men and women, which increased the membership of the Estates from 15 to 21, and which introduced a College of General Government (Dutch: College van Algemeen Bestuur) which was to assist the Governor in the everyday government of the colony, and which was the precursor to the Cabinet of Ministers. The new constitution took effect in July 1948.

Military 
In 1868 the Dutch government created the Netherlands Armed Forces in Suriname (TRIS) which served as the Dutch colonial army in Suriname. This meant that like the Royal Netherlands East Indies Army (KNIL) in the Dutch East Indies, TRIS fell under the responsibility of the Dutch Ministry of Colonies, instead of the Dutch Ministry of Defense. The size of the TRIS army was, however, small, compared to the KNIL army for the former colony of Indonesia, it consisted of two infantry and two artillery companies. In total 636 soldiers served in the TRIS army. These soldiers were tasked with patrolling and policing duties within the Dutch colony of Surinam.

See also
Willem III
Amsterdam
Dutch East Indies
Saba
Poenale sanctie

References

Further reading

Online
TRIS online
TRIS

External links 
 Dutch West Indies 1630-1975

Dutch colonisation of the Guianas
History of Suriname
Former colonies in South America
Former Dutch colonies
Dutch colonization of the Americas
Dutch-speaking countries and territories
States and territories established in 1667
States and territories disestablished in 1954
1667 establishments in South America
1954 disestablishments in South America
1667 establishments in the Dutch Empire
1954 disestablishments in the Dutch Empire
Netherlands–Suriname relations
Former settlements and colonies of the Dutch West India Company